Aleksandr Filatov (8 March 1928 – 31 March 1999) was a Soviet alpine skier. He competed in three events at the 1956 Winter Olympics.

References

External links
 

1928 births
1999 deaths
Soviet male alpine skiers
Olympic alpine skiers of the Soviet Union
Alpine skiers at the 1956 Winter Olympics
Skiers from Moscow